Sompol Kukasemkij (born January 24, 1963) is a former Thai badminton player. He was one of the most important players in the late 1980s and early 1990s in this sport in Thailand.

Career
In 1992 Sompol Kukasemkij joined the Olympics in men's singles. He won his first round match against Anders Nielsen, but lost in the second round against Alan Budikusuma. In 1990 he won in his home at the Thailand Open. In 1985 he was eliminated in the World Cup in the second round against Prakash Padukone. Two years earlier, he was the winner at the top of the podium at the Swiss Open.

Nationally, he won for the first time in the Thai championships in 1984 in men's singles. Eight other titles followed until the 1993.

Sompol Kukasemkij also served as the coach of Thailand national Badminton team.

Achievements

Southeast Asian Games 
Men's singles

IBF World Grand Prix 
The World Badminton Grand Prix sanctioned by International Badminton Federation (IBF) from 1983 to 2006.

Men's singles

References

Sompol Kukasemkij
Sompol Kukasemkij
1963 births
Living people
Southeast Asian Games medalists in badminton
Sompol Kukasemkij
Competitors at the 1985 Southeast Asian Games
Badminton players at the 1986 Asian Games
Badminton players at the 1990 Asian Games
Badminton players at the 1994 Asian Games
Sompol Kukasemkij
Badminton players at the 1992 Summer Olympics